Konstantinos Agathophron Nikolopoulos (1786 – 12 June 1841) was a Greek composer, philologist and colleague of Adamantios Korais.

Biography
Konstantinos Nikolopoulos was born in Smyrna, Ottoman Empire and grew up in Paris. Being somewhat of a "Renaissance Man" (that is, an individual with many varied skills and talents), he was employed as librarian in the French Institute, where he worked for much of his life. 

He was a member of the Philiki Etaireia, the underground revolutionary Greek organization working for the liberation of the Greeks from the Ottoman Empire. He died in Paris, at the age of 55, while he donated his library to the municipality of Andritsaina, origin place of his father.

Compositions
Josef Fink helped bring some fame to Nikolopoulos by referring to his compositions in "Die Arkadische Sendung Des Konstantinos Nikolopoulos" in 1980. Some of his works were based on Ancient Greek texts, while he composed also religious music. Some of his compositions include the following:

 Three Romances
 Ezekiel's Dream
 A Cantata for Palaeon Patron Germanos
 The Song of the Greek
 The Cry of the Greeks
 Prooemion to the Iliad
 Kyrie Eleison (religious)

References

External links
Princeton Classical Languages Instruction Project (contains a segment of his "Prooemion to the Iliad")

1786 births
1841 deaths
Greek composers
Smyrniote Greeks
Greek people of the Greek War of Independence
People of the Modern Greek Enlightenment
Members of the Filiki Eteria
18th-century Greek musicians
19th-century Greek musicians
Musicians from İzmir